Mayhill is a district of Swansea, Wales, at the top of a steep hill of the same name just north west of the city centre, partly separated from Townhill to the west.

History
Mayhill was one the first areas of Swansea to benefit from the development of council housing in the early years of the 20th century when Swansea Borough Council sought to address the issue of the poor quality of the housing stock available to working class families. One of the first projects it authorised was the Baptist Well Estate, a scheme for 142 terraced houses which included Shelley and Byron Crescents (subsequently renamed High View and Long Ridge respectively), built in 1910 on the lower slopes of Mayhill. Influenced by the housing reform movement of the time, the Council went on to organise an exhibition in 1910 of newly designed Garden city movement style houses which were allocated to a site in Mayhill.  Twenty-nine houses were built by 1914, eight by the Council's own Direct Adminstration unit (2 to 12 Islwyn Road). The Council's plans to expand the Mayhill Garden City development had to be deferred until the mid-1920s due to the outbreak of the first world war.

Before the Mayhill Garden City development the area was occupied by farmland. At the eastern end of Long Ridge is a Jewish burial ground which dates from 1768 and the site of Baptist Well, part of a water course which supplied the town before reservoir storage was devloped.

Mayhill district

Mayhill is geographically divided into Mayhill South (Mayhill Garden City) and Mayhill North (Mountain View) by Townhill Road. It is in the Townhill ward.

The south side of Mayhill overlooks the city centre, docklands and Swansea Bay. A prominent landmark on Mayhill, visible from the city centre and Hafod, is Sea View Primary School designed by the Swansea Borough architect,           Ernest Morgan. The north side of Mayhill looks out towards the northern districts of Swansea and onwards towards the mountainous terrain of the Brecon Beacons.

Mayhill features several park and nature reserve areas, including Bryn y Don and a Site of Special Scientific Interest on the border of Townhill, opposite Our Lady of Lourdes Roman Catholic church. The largest open space recreational area is around Sea View Primary School and includes parkland, small wooded areas, and heathland. There is also a small picnic park along Bryn Y Don Road, and woodland between Waun Wen Road and Townhill Road.

West End F.C. play at Pryderi Park Stadium in the area.

References

Districts of Swansea